East Antrim Hockey Club was a men's field hockey club based in Newtownabbey, County Antrim, Northern Ireland, 7 miles north of Belfast. It was affiliated to the Ulster Branch of the Irish Hockey Association and was one of the oldest clubs in Irish hockey. The club's motto was Non Sibi Cunctus. It folded circa 2005.

References

External links
 East Antrim Hockey Club

Field hockey clubs in Northern Ireland
Sports clubs in County Antrim
1902 establishments in Ireland
2005 disestablishments in Ireland
Field hockey clubs established in 1902
Field hockey clubs disestablished in 2005
Newtownabbey
Defunct field hockey clubs in Ireland